The Garagiste Festivals are Californian non-profit wine festivals showcasing wines made by small-scale artisan "garagiste" producers.

Locations
The Garagiste Festivals were founded by garagistes Stewart McLennan, Douglas Minnick and Dan Erland Andersen. The first festival was held in Paso Robles, California in 2011 and a festival has taken place there every November since then, except 2020 when it was held virtually. Paso Robles is the center of the garagiste movement: there are some 127 wineries with annual production of 1,000 or fewer cases in Paso's home county, San Luis Obispo (SLO). An event known as "The Garagiste Festival: Southern Exposure" also takes place in the Santa Ynez Valley. The festivals have been named one of the “Top Nine Incredible Epicurean Vacations” by ABC News.

Purpose
The Garagiste Festivals are dedicated to artisan producers who make handcrafted small-lot production wines. These festivals aim to identify the best and most innovative limited-production winemakers and to promote and showcase them to a broad audience of wine consumers.

Organizers
Garagiste Festivals are produced by Garagiste Events, a non-profit dedicated to furthering the education of future winemakers and those training for employment within the wine industry.  Proceeds from the festivals are donated to the Cal Poly Wine and Viticulture Program.

References

External links
Official website

Festivals in California
Wine festivals in the United States
San Luis Obispo County, California